The Government of India Act 1833 (3 & 4 Will 4 c 85), or the Charter Act 1833, was an Act of the Parliament of the United Kingdom, later retitled as the Saint Helena Act 1833. It extended the royal charter granted to the East India Company for an additional twenty years, and restructured the governance of British India.

Provisions
The Act contained the following provisions:
 It ended the commercial activities of the British East India Company and made it a purely administrative body. In particular, the Company lost its monopoly on trade with China and other parts of the Far East.
 While ending its commercial mandate, the Act extended the East India Company's charter by 20 years. This meant that other provisions of the original Elizabethan charter, including the right to raise armies, wage war, and rule conquered territories, was perpetuated.
 It redesignated the Governor-General of Bengal as the Governor-General of India. For the first time, the government run by him was referred to as the 'Government of India.' His council as now known as the 'India Council'. Lord William Bentinck became the first Governor-General of India in the end of 1833.
 The "Governor-General in Council" were given exclusive legislative powers, that is, the right to proclaim laws which would be enforced as the law of the land across the whole of British India.
 Thus, the Act deprived the Governors of Bombay and Madras of the legislative powers which they had enjoyed until then.
 The Act attempted to introduce a system of open competitions for the selection of civil servants. However, this provision was negated after opposition from the Court of Directors who continued to hold the privilege of appointing Company officials.
 The Act categorically stated that no native of India should be disabled from holding any place, office, or employment, by reason of his religion.
 Control of the island of Saint Helena was transferred from the East India Company to the Crown.
With the exception of section 112, vesting Saint Helena in the monarchy, the act was repealed by the Government of India Act 1915.

Name

When short titles were authorised for British legislation by the Short Titles Act 1896, the Act was titled as the Government of India Act 1833. However, following the repeal of most of its provisions other than those dealing with Saint Helena, it was given a new short title by the Statute Law Revision Act 1948, as the Saint Helena Act 1833. As the main provision of the Act was to extend the Company's charter, it is sometimes referred to as the Charter Act 1833, although this is not an official short title.

References

External links
 The Saint Helena Act 1833, as amended, from the UK Statute Law Database.

History of Saint Helena
August 1833 events
British East India Company
Acts of the Parliament of the United Kingdom concerning India
United Kingdom Acts of Parliament 1833